The 1970–71 North Carolina Tar Heels men's basketball team represented the University of North Carolina at Chapel Hill during the 1970–71 men's college basketball season.

Schedule

References

North Carolina Tar Heels men's basketball seasons
North Carolina
North Carolina
National Invitation Tournament championship seasons
Tar
Tar